Heliosia charopa is a moth of the family Erebidae. It was described by Alfred Jefferis Turner in 1904. It is found in Australia, where it has been recorded from Queensland.

References

Nudariina
Moths described in 1904